Muky was an Argentine brand of die-cast toy model cars. The brand was popular in Argentina between the 1970s and the 1980s. Most were diecast seconds or knockoffs of early Mattel Hot Wheels.

At its peak, the factory produced 50,000 to 60,000 models by month until 1991, when the factory closed due to competition from imported products.

Company 

Muky was made by Induguay S.A. "Fábrica de Juguetes Muky" ("Muky Toy Factory"). Established by Libio Conti and his brother, the company was located in the city of Gualeguay, in Entre Ríos Province, 145 miles north-west of Buenos Aires.

Virtually all of the models made by Muky were copies of early Mattel's Hot Wheels like the Custom Corvette, the Lola T70, the Custom Eldorado, or the Dodge Deora. Thus the company is often called the "Hot Wheels of Argentina". Muky were not as popular, or as collectible today, as the country's Buby toys, which made Argentine Ramblers and Falcons and other vehicles that may have been more familiar to children there.

Change of Management 
In the late 1970s, because of the worsening economic environment in Argentina, the DeConti brothers moved to Brazil and began manufacturing toys there called "Superveloz". In 1984 or 1985, a certain Dell Arciprete bought Muky, and using most of the same dies, again began making Mukys. Arciprete's Muky line added a few new vehicles. The Arciprete family ran a fumigation business at the same time as Muky.

The later Mukys were numbered from eight to forty, numbers one through six having been lost along the line somewhere. Also, these later models' chassis were cast in plastic, and Mukys were distributed also to Uruguay and Spain.

Questions on Tooling 
How Induguay came to possess the Mattel dies is uncertain; one story is that the DeConti brothers stole the dies from Mattel, but two other prevalent theories exist, both logical. One is that the models were carefully copied from blueprints. Another is that third party agents, with the approval of Mattel, sold some dies to the De Contis. In any event, perusal of catalogs of old and new models shows that few of the 37 models originally manufactured by Induguay were ever reissued by Mattel. Apparently, the Arciprete family has kept the tooling and doesn't deny that they might again someday make more Mukys.

Products 
List of Muky diecast cars, by number:

 7 - 1941 Ford
 8 - Lola GT Spoiler
 9 - Ford MKN Turbo
 10 - Ford GT40 
 11 - Chevelle SS 
 12 - Lincoln Continental
 13 - Arenero Muky
 14 - Lola GT 40
 15 - Dodge Charger
 16 - Corvette Special
 17 - Motorhome
 18 - Ford MK IV
 19a - Transporter Van 
 19b - Mc Laren MCA Turbo 
 20 - Ford GT 40
 21 - Cadillac Eldorado
 22 - Lamborghini
 23 - Tank truck
 24 - Police car
 25 - Cattle truck
 26 - Super Turbo
 27 - Furgón (truck)
 28 - Chaparral 2 G
 29 - Skoda Baby
 30 - Ford Coupé 36
 31 - Volcador (truck)
 32 - Lancia 3000
 33 - Rapit Urbano (truck)
 34 - Mc Laren MGA
 35 - Firetruck
 36 - Servicio Médico
 37 - Taxi
 38 - Volkswagen
 39 - Ferrari 308

References
 

Toy brands
Toy cars and trucks
Model manufacturers of Argentina
Die-cast toys